The 1947–48 season was Mansfield Town's tenth season in the Football League and sixth season in the Third Division North, they finished in 8th position with 45 points.

Final league table

Results

Football League Third Division North

FA Cup

Squad statistics
 Squad list sourced from

References
General
 Mansfield Town 1947–48 at soccerbase.com (use drop down list to select relevant season)

Specific

Mansfield Town F.C. seasons
Mansfield Town